Alderwasley is a civil parish in the Amber Valley district of Derbyshire, England.  The parish contains 16 listed buildings that are recorded in the National Heritage List for England.  All the listed buildings are designated at Grade II, the lowest of the three grades, which is applied to "buildings of national importance and special interest".  The parish contains the village of Alderwasley and the surrounding countryside.  The listed buildings consist of houses and associated structures, farmhouses, a country house converted into a school, a church and a former chapel, a public house, a road bridge, a milestone, a former toll house, and a war memorial.


Buildings

References

Citations

Sources

 

Lists of listed buildings in Derbyshire